Sigma Eta Chi was a national sorority operating in the United States.

History 

The purpose of the sorority was "to form a social unit in which spiritual and intellectual development might advance in harmony".

Baird's Manual (12th ed and the Online Baird's Archive) notes that the sorority later became non-exclusive with membership and other sororities permissible.  It eventually disbanded.

Chapters
The sorority grew to include six chapters by 1930, with possibly two more by the late 1950s: 

In 1928, plans were put in place for the sorority to become a national organization. A national constitution was written, national officers were elected, and the first national convention took place in June of the same year.

The sorority continued at least into the middle of the 20th century, though the final date of dissolution is unknown. A chapter in Ames, Iowa was meeting in 1948. The Kansas State Royal Purple Yearbook of 1948 not only notes the growth of its chapter, but also a special ceremony called Luchnokaia. The yearbook describes the service as happening during one Sunday in Lent. Each member lit a candle from seven candles, the seven representing the seven "great guiding lights" of Christianity. Each member left the church "pledging to live a more consecrated life". The University of Nebraska Cornhusker Yearbook of 1958 lists the president of the sorority.

The records of the University of Northern Iowa indicate that Sigma Eta Chi was classified as a Congregational sorority well into the 1950s. However, in the early 1970s, a group with the same name emerged as a service sorority.

The organization later would affiliate members of the Evangelical and Reformed churches, in addition to Congregational.

Insignia 

Baird's Manual of American College Fraternities described the badge as "a lighted candle in a candlestick with a ruby set for the flame, the letters 'Σ H X', on a background of blue enamel with a border of white or yellow gold set with white or blue stones; the letters being arranged vertically to the right of the candle". The pledge pin was "a lighted candle in a candlestick, cast in silver".

The official colors were azure blue and silver, the official flowers were the rose and blue larkspur, and the official publication, Luchnokaia, was published three times a year.

References 

Defunct fraternities and sororities
Ohio State University
1923 establishments in Ohio
Student organizations established in 1923